Nikyatu Jusu is an American independent writer, director, producer, editor and assistant professor in film and video at George Mason University. Jusu's works center on the complexities of Black female characters and in particular, displaced, immigrant women in the United States. Her work includes African Booty Scratcher (2007), Flowers (2015), Suicide By Sunlight (2019), and Nanny, which received the Grand Jury Prize at the 2022 Sundance Film Festival.

Early life and education 
Jusu was born in Atlanta, Georgia, to Sierra Leonean parents Hannah Khoury and Ronald Jusu. She attended Duke University in Durham, North Carolina with the intention to become a biomedical engineer. An unexpected meeting with a screenwriting professor introduced her to the world of film making and she changed her focus. Jusu graduated with a Bachelor of Arts degree in Film/Cinema/Video Studies in 2005. She later studied narrative filmmaking at New York University's Tisch graduate film school and received a master of fine arts degree in Film/Cinema/Video Studies in 2011.

Career

2008 – 2018: Career beginnings 
In 2008, Jusu wrote and directed African Booty Scratcher for her second year graduate film project at NYU Tisch. It is a semi-autobiographical film that tells the story of Isatu, a young Sierra Leonean American. The story highlights the conflict of differing cultures while Isatu contemplates which culture to please when picking a prom dress. She developed the film with a budget of $7,000. African Booty Scratcher was eventually acquired by HBO.

Jusu released Say Grace Before Drowning in 2010, again as writer and director. With a bigger budget of $35,000, Jusu created a film that explains the relationship between a young girl and her African refugee mother. This film was also acquired by HBO.

In 2011, she wrote and directed the narrative film, Black Swan Theory, that was labeled as an experimental work. The plot of the film revolves around Sonya, a psychiatric casualty of war, who accepts a murder-for-hire assignment. Jusu's developed the film on a budget of $3,000.

Jusu began developing a feature film, FREE THE TOWN in 2013. The film follows three people in Freetown, Sierra Leone and was selected for inclusion in Sundance Institute's inaugural Diverse Writers Workshop.

She co-wrote and co-directed Flowers in 2015 with Yvonne Michelle Shirley, a classmate from film school. The coming of age film tells the story of two Brooklyn teens looking to get revenge on their teacher until their plan backfires. Jusu explained that she wanted to draw attention to the struggles of black girls in school because she feels that only black boys are in the spotlight of struggle in the United States education system. Flowers was shown at film festivals such as BlackStar Film Festival. It was acquired by HBO and received the HBO Short Film Award.

2017 – present: Suicide by Sunlight and Nanny 
In 2017, Jusu joined the faculty of George Mason University as an assistant professor in the film and video studies department. That year she was selected as a recipient of Tribeca Film Institute and Chanel's Through Her Lens program to develop the short film Suicide by Sunlight, co-written with R. Shanea Williams. Suicide by Sunlight centers a Black vampire protected from the sun because of her melanin. The film was executive produced by Terence Nance, directed by Jusu, and stars Natalie Paul. It debuted at the 2019 Sundance Film Festival on January 25, 2019.

On April 13, 2021, it was announced that Jusu's debut feature film, Nanny, is being produced by Stay Gold Features and Topic Studios. The horror film follows a west African undocumented nanny taking care of a privileged child on the Upper West Side and preparing for the arrival of her son. The script was selected for the 2020 Black List and the film debuted at the 2022 Sundance Film Festival on January 22, 2022. Shortly after Nanny won the Grand Jury Prize in the U.S. Dramatic Competition, Blumhouse Productions and Amazon Studios acquired the film and is set to be released theatrically on November 23, 2022 and then streaming on Amazon Prime Video on December 16, 2022. In February 2022, it was announced that Jusu's next horror film project was acquired by Monkeypaw Productions and Universal Pictures. In October 2022, it was announced that Jusu signed on to direct a sequel to Night of the Living Dead (1968). In November 2022, Jusu's untitled horror film with Monkeypaw Productions would be a feature length adaptation of her short film Suicide by Sunlight.

Accolades 

 The Most Promising Filmmaker Award from Duke University. 
 Jusu's short film African Booty Scratcher earned festival acceptances and awards, including a Directors Guild Honorable Mention, HBO Short Film Award and JT3 Artist Award.  
 The short film Say Grace Before Drowning won the Spike Lee Fellowship Award, Directors Guild of America Jury Award, HBO Short Film Award, the Panavision Equipment Grant, Princess Grace Foundation Grant, and Puffin Foundation Grant. 
 Jusu won the Shadow and Act Filmmaker Challenge for her short film Black Swan Theory. 
 Flowers won the HBO short film award and was acquired by HBO. 
 Her screenplay Free The Town was selected for Africa's most prestigious Film Market, the 2013 Durban Film Mart, and one of 5 narrative films selected for Film Independent's Fast Track. It was one of 12 projects invited to participate in Sundance Institute's inaugural Diverse Writers Workshop. Free the Town was never shot because of the Ebola outbreak.
 Her narrative film Suicide by Sunlight was awarded a Rooftop Films/Adrienne Shelly Foundation Short Film Grant and was funded by the production grant Through Her Lens: The Tribeca Chanel Women's Filmmaker Program sponsored by the Tribeca Film Institute and Chanel. The film was one of the 5 to be nominated, and won the grand prize. 
 Jusu was nominated for and won a residency at Headlands Artist Residency, which she attended in July 2018 to work on her latest feature script.
 Jusu and her co-writer R. Shanea Williams were 2017 recipients of a full production grant as well as production support from the Tribeca CHANEL Women's Filmmaker Program, Through Her Lens.

Filmography 

Short film

Feature film

Television

Awards and nominations

References

External links 
 Official website 
 

1982 births
American filmmakers
Living people
American people of Sierra Leonean descent
American women film directors
American women screenwriters
African-American film directors
Screenwriters from Georgia (U.S. state)
Duke University alumni
Tisch School of the Arts alumni